This article is a vexillological summary of all flags and symbols in current use by the island nation of Malta. More information on the history of the various flags and emblems, as well as on their equivalents which are no longer in use, is found on the specific articles, linked to in the subtitle headings.

National flag and coat of arms
The National Flag of Malta is defined in the Constitution and consists of two equal vertical stripes, white in the hoist and red in the fly, with a representation of the George Cross, edged with red, in the canton of the white stripe; the breadth of the flag is one and a half times its height. It was adopted when Malta became independent from the United Kingdom on 21 September 1964. The George Cross decoration was awarded by King George VI for collective gallantry in 1942. Malta remained the only collective awardee of the decoration until it was awarded to the Royal Ulster Constabulary of Northern Ireland in 1999.

The current emblem of Malta is described by the Emblem and Public Seal of Malta Act (1988) as a shield showing an heraldic representation of the National Flag; above the shield a mural crown in gold with a sally port and eight turrets (five only being visible) representing the fortifications of Malta and denoting a City State; and around the shield a wreath of two branches: the dexter of Olive, the sinister of Palm, symbols of peace and courage to victory traditionally associated with Malta, all in their proper colours, tied at base with a white ribbon, backed red and upon which are written the words  in capital letters in black.

Other flags or symbols

In current use

Historical Flags

Knights' Flag (1530-1798)
The original flag of the Knights Hospitaller consisted of a white Maltese Cross on a black background, however this was never used in Malta. The only flag used in Malta in the time of the Knights consisted of a white symmetrical cross on a red field with the cross having a width of 1/5 the height of the flag - similar to the flag of England, colors reversed with a proportion of 5:3. The flag is still used by the Knights' modern successor, the Sovereign Military Order of Malta.

Colonial Flags (19th century-1964)

Several flags were used by the British Colonial administration of Malta prior to independence in 1964. Between 1798 and 1813, the Neapolitan flag and the Union flag were used in Malta. After Malta became a Crown Colony a new flag was adopted, having the colours of the Order of Saint John, but with different proportions and defaced by the Union flag.  Later flags consisted of the British blue ensign defaced by the coat of arms of Malta.

Standard of the Queen of Malta (1967-1974)
The Standard of the Queen of Malta was introduced in 1967. It consisted of a Maltese flag defaced by the personal flag of Queen Elizabeth II.

Other symbols

References